Namawar Shah Ghazi was the Baduspanid ruler (ustandar) of Rustamdar from 1272/3 to 1301/2. He was the son and successor of Shahragim. 

An obscure ruler, he died in 1301/2 and was succeeded by his brother Kay Khusraw.

References

Sources 
 

13th-century Baduspanid rulers
14th-century Baduspanid rulers
1300s deaths
Year of birth unknown
Year of death uncertain